The Blue Train is the Turkish State Railways premier passenger train service started in the 1980s. The first Blue Train operated between İstanbul and Ankara, entering service in 1979. More Blue Train services were added later on. The İzmir Blue Train, Central Anatolia Blue Train, Çukurova Blue Train and 4th of September Blue Train were are overnight trains. These trains had custom railcars, built by TÜVASAŞ, all painted blue with a blue painted DE 24000 series locomotive pulling the train. The current remnant is just a branding with regular rolling stock. Today there are only three blue trains are in service.

Service
Blue Train (1979–2000) - Haydarpaşa (İstanbul)-İzmit-Sakarya(Arifiye)-Bilecik-Eskişehir-Ankara
İzmir Blue Train (1984– ) - Ankara-Eskişehir-Kütahya-Balıkesir-Manisa-Basmane (İzmir)
Çukurova Blue Train (1986–2016 ) - Ankara-Kırıkkale-Kayseri (Boğazköprü)-Niğde-Adana
Central Anatolia Blue Train (1989–2012 ) - Haydarpaşa (İstanbul)-İzmit-Sakarya(Arifiye)-Bilecik-Enveriye (Eskişehir)-Kütahya-Afyonkarahisar-Konya-Karaman- Ulukışla (Niğde)-Adana 
4th of September Blue Train (1993–2007 , 2011–2016 , 2021– ) - Ankara-Kırıkkale-Kayseri-Sivas-Malatya
Konya Blue Train (2012– ) - Konya-Afyonkarahisar-Uşak-Manisa-Basmane(İzmir)

References

Passenger rail transport in Turkey
Turkish State Railways